Matt Castlen (born August 14, 1986) is an American politician who last served in the Kentucky Senate representing the 8th district from 2019 to 2023. He previously served in the Kentucky House of Representatives from the 14th district from 2017 to 2019.

References

1986 births
Living people
Republican Party members of the Kentucky House of Representatives
Republican Party Kentucky state senators
21st-century American politicians